Mathurapur Assembly constituency was a Legislative Assembly constituency of South 24 Parganas district in the Indian State of West Bengal.

Overview
As a consequence of the order of the Delimitation Commission in respect of the Delimitation of constituencies in the West Bengal, Mathurapur Assembly constituency ceases to exist from 2011.

Mathurapur Assembly constituency was a part of Mathurapur (Lok Sabha constituency).

Members of Legislative Assembly

Election Results

Legislative Assembly Elections 1977-2006
In 2006 and 2001, Kanti Ganguly of CPI(M) won the Mathurapur Assembly constituency defeating his nearest rival Satya Ranjan Bapuli of AITC. Satya Ranjan Bapuli of INC won five times in a row defeating Kanti Ganguly of CPI(M) in 1996 and 1991, Brindaban Bhandari of CPI(M) in 1987 and 1982, and Rabin Mondal of SUCI(C) in 1977.

Legislative Assembly Elections 1952-1972
Birendranath Halder of INC won in 1972. Renupada Halder of SUCI(C) won in 1971 and 1969. H.Halder of Bangla Congress won in 1967. In 1962, Mathurapur Assembly constituency had two seats. Bhusan Chandra Das of INC won the Mathurapur Dakshin seat and Brindaban Gayen of INC won the Mathurapur Uttar seat. In 1957 and 1952, Mathurapur Assembly constituency was a joint seat. Bhusan Chandra Das and Brindaban Gayen, both of INC won in 1957. Bhusan Chandra Das of KMPP and Brindaban Gayen of INC won in 1952.

References

Former assembly constituencies of West Bengal
Politics of South 24 Parganas district